Abdulrahman Saleh Khalfan Al-Alawi (born 8 September 1986), commonly known as Abdulrahman Saleh, is an Omani footballer who plays for Al-Suwaiq Club in Oman Professional League.

Club career
On 27 January 2014, he signed a six-month contract with his former club, Al-Suwaiq Club.

Club career statistics

International career
Abdulrahman is part of the first team squad of the Oman national football team. He was selected for the national team for the first time in 2009. He made his first appearance for Oman on 11 August 2010 in a friendly match against Kazakhstan. He has made appearances in the 2010 Gulf Cup of Nations and the 2014 FIFA World Cup qualification and has represented the national team in the 2011 AFC Asian Cup qualification.

Honours

Club
With Al-Suwaiq
Oman Super Cup (1): 2013

References

External links

1986 births
Living people
Omani footballers
Oman international footballers
Association football defenders
Al-Tali'aa SC players
Al-Musannah SC players
Sur SC players
Suwaiq Club players
Fanja SC players
Oman Professional League players
People from Al Buraimi Governorate